Abdoulaye Jules Keita (born 20 July 1998) is a Guinean professional footballer who most recently played as a midfielder for RC Lens.

Keita started his senior career at Dijon in Ligue 1, before joining Lens in September 2019.

Club career
On 20 July 2020, Keita left Lens and joined Bulgarian club CSKA Sofia on a season-long loan. In June 2021, CSKA Sofia decided against exercising the purchase option and Keita returned to Lens.

International career
Keita debuted for the Guinea national team in a 1–0 friendly loss to Comoros on 12 October 2019.

Career statistics

Club

International

Honours
CSKA Sofia
 Bulgarian Cup: 2020–21

Guinea U17
Africa U-17 Cup of Nations bronze: 2015

References

External links
 

1998 births
Living people
Sportspeople from Conakry
Guinean footballers
Association football midfielders
Guinea international footballers
Guinea under-20 international footballers
Guinea youth international footballers
Ligue 1 players
Ligue 2 players
First Professional Football League (Bulgaria) players
Dijon FCO players
RC Lens players
PFC CSKA Sofia players
Guinean expatriate footballers
Guinean expatriate sportspeople in France
Expatriate footballers in France
Guinean expatriate sportspeople in Bulgaria
Expatriate footballers in Bulgaria